Lunglei Government College is the biggest college in the town of Lunglei, Mizoram. It is graded B++ by NAAC. Talks are underway now with UGC to set up Mizoram University campus in Lunglei Government College campus, thus making it a constituent college of Mizoram University like Pachhunga University College. The College has 1250 students and 63 Faculty.

Location

Lunglei Government College is located in  Lunglei which has a population of 77,482. The College has a 29.74 bigha of land in the heart of the town bearing Land Lease No.DLP 25 of 1998

History
Lunglei Government College (LGC) was established on 10 September 1964 under the concerted efforts of the then elites of the society. It was provincialized in 1976 by the Government of Mizoram. The College was then recognized under section 2(b) of the University Grants Commission (UGC) Act in 1981 and was accorded the 12(b) status in July 2008.  It is currently affiliated to Mizoram University.

Departments
Lunglei Government College has two streams: Arts and Science with 8 subjects’ areas of Arts and 6 subjects of Science. The College is the only Government College which offers the study of ‘Philosophy’ and ‘Geology’ in the State.

Facilities
The College has one girls' hostel and another two hostels under construction. The Consortium of Educational Communication (CEC) and Indian Space Research Organisation (ISRO) sponsored INFINIUM has been installed EDUSAT satellite receiver in 2008, to impart better education in the College. A Certificate course in Computer Application was started at the College from 27 July 2009 with the financial assistance of UGC. The College multipurpose hall was inaugurated in April 2018.

See also
Education in India
Education in Mizoram
Mizoram University
Literacy in India

References

External links
 

Universities and colleges in Mizoram
Colleges affiliated to Mizoram University
Lunglei